Printify is a Latvian website that is based in Riga, Lativa.

History
Printify was founded in 2015 in Riga, Latvia by Artis Kehris, Gatis Dukurs, and James Berdigans. Later, it established its headquarters in San Francisco, California. It is headed by Janis Berdigans.

In May 2018, Printify received an investment of $1 million to expand its services to the United States. In the following year, it received an additional investment of $3 million, including from H&M.

In December 2019, Printful sued Printify in the United States District Court for the Northern District of California for copyright infringement.

In November 2020, Printify relocated its headquarters to Spikeri, Riga. It was also included in the Financial Times list in 2020.

In October 2021, Printify received an investment of $45 million in Series A funding.

Platform
The platform of Printify helps connect its users with printing services providers.

As of September 2021, there were two million users that were active on the website.

References

Latvian websites
2015 establishments in Latvia